The 1995–96 Essex Senior Football League season was the 25th in the history of Essex Senior Football League a football competition in England.

League table

The league featured 15 clubs which competed in the league last season, no new clubs joined the league this season.

League table

References

Essex Senior Football League seasons
1995–96 in English football leagues